The British Swimming Championships - 200 metres backstroke winners formerly the (Amateur Swimming Association (ASA) National Championships) are listed below. The event was originally contested over 220 yards and then switched to the metric conversion of 200 metres in 1971.

Kathy Read (married name Osher) has won a record number of senior National titles (29), which includes eleven 200 metres backstroke titles.

200 metres backstroke champions

See also
British Swimming
List of British Swimming Championships champions

References

Swimming in the United Kingdom